Ion Gavăț (19 July 1900 – 18 June 1978) was a Romanian bobsledder. He competed in the four-man event at the 1928 Winter Olympics.

References

1900 births
1978 deaths
Romanian male bobsledders
Olympic bobsledders of Romania
Bobsledders at the 1928 Winter Olympics
People from Vrancea County